The Luhmühlen Horse Trials are an annual equestrian eventing competition held in Luhmühlen, Salzhausen, Germany. Riders compete at the highest level: the CCI*****. There are only six events of this kind in the world, the others being the Badminton Horse Trials, the Burghley Horse Trials, the Kentucky Three-Day Event, the Australian International Three Day Event and the Stars of Pau.

Luhmühlen originally held CCI** and CCI*** events. The CCI**** event was first held in 2005, making it the first event in mainland Europe to hold an eventing competition at that level. Luhmühlen follows the new format, "without steeplechase."

After the 2018 season, the FEI added an introductory level below CCI*, bumping all subsequent levels upward. While there was no change to the difficulty of the competition, the added level forced all former CCI**** competitions to re-classify as CCI*****.

In 1982 Luhmühlen hosted the Eventing World Championship. In August 2019 Luhmühlen was the venue of the European Eventing Championships for the sixth time (1975, 1979, 1987, 1999, 2011, 2019). Before the 2011 event the show ground was completely rebuilt.

Past winners of the CCI*****

References

External links
Luhmühlen Horse Trials

Eventing
Sport in Lower Saxony
Equestrian sports competitions in Germany